Acontias is a genus of lizards of family Scincidae.

Acontias may also refer to:

Agkistrodon, synonym Acontias, a genus of venomous pit vipers 
Ethmia acontias, a moth in the family Depressariida

See also
 Acontia, a genus of moths of the family Noctuidae
 Acontius (disambiguation)